The following is a list of commercial radio broadcasters and radio networks in the United States.

Table of broadcasters and networks

Major English-language commercial broadcasters and networks

Other commercial radio broadcasters and networks
 American Urban Radio Networks
 Associated Press Radio Network
 Bloomberg Radio
 Business Talk Radio Network
 Lifestyle Talk Radio Network
 Cable Radio Network
 Clear Media Network
 Chinese Radio Network (Mandarin)
 Compass Media Networks
 Walt Disney Television
 Radio Disney
 Envision Networks
 ESPN, Inc.
 ESPN Radio
 ESPN Deportes Radio
 Genesis Communications Network
Gen Media Partners
HRN Media (Hispanic/ Multi-Cultural Radio Network)
Sun Broadcast Group
 IMG Worldwide
 IMG College (consisting of 76 individual radio networks)
 ISP Sports
 MRN Radio (Motor Racing Network)
 MannGroup Radio Services
 Music of Your Life (formerly distributed by Jones Radio Network)
 Northern Broadcasting System
 Performance Racing Network
 Progressive Radio Network
 Radio America
 RadioLinx Broadcast Marketing
 REACH Media
 Rockcastle Media Networks
 Salem Media Group
 Salem Radio Network
 Skyview Networks
 ABC News Radio
 CBS News Radio
 Spanish Broadcasting System
 Sports Byline USA
 Sports Radio America
 Superadio
 Syndication Networks
 Talk Media Network
 Talk Radio Network
 Tom Kent Radio Network
 United Stations Radio Networks
 Univision Radio (Spanish-language radio network, owned by Univision)
 USA Radio Network

State commercial networks
 Alabama Radio Network, a subsidiary of iHeartMedia.
 Arizona News Radio, a subsidiary of Skyview Networks.
 Arkansas Radio Network, a subsidiary of Cumulus Media
 California Headline News, a subsidiary of Skyview Networks
 Cowboy State News Network, a subsidiary of Montgomery Broadcasting L.L.C. (owner of KFBC in Cheyenne, WY)
 Florida News Network, a subsidiary of iHeartMedia.
 Georgia News Network, a subsidiary of iHeartMedia.
 Illinois Radio Network, a subsidiary of the Franklin Center for Government and Public Integrity.
 Network Indiana, a subsidiary of Emmis Communications.
 Radio Iowa, a subsidiary of Learfield Communications.
 Kansas Information Network, a subsidiary of Morris Communications.
 Kansas Agriculture Network, a subsidiary of Morris Communications.
 Kentucky News Network, a subsidiary of iHeartMedia.
 Louisiana Radio Network.
 Michigan Media Network.
 Michigan Talk Network, a subsidiary of Townsquare Media.
 Millennium News Network (serving New Jersey), a subsidiary of WKXW.
 Minnesota News Network, a subsidiary of Learfield Communications.
 Mississippi News Network, a subsidiary of TeleSouth Communications.
 Missouri Net, a subsidiary of Learfield Communications.
 Northern News Network of Montana, a subsidiary of Northern Broadcasting System.
 Nebraska Radio Network,  a subsidiary of Learfield Communications.
 North Carolina News Network, a subsidiary of Curtis Media Group.
 Dakota News Network of North and South Dakota, a subsidiary of Midwest Information Systems.
 Ohio News Network, a subsidiary of Dispatch Broadcast Group.
 Oklahoma News Network, a subsidiary of iHeartMedia.
 Radio Oklahoma Network, a subsidiary of Griffin Communications
 Radio PA Networks of Pennsylvania, a subsidiary of WITF Enterprises.
 South Carolina Radio Network, a subsidiary of Learfield Communications.
 Tennessee Radio Networks, a subsidiary of iHeartMedia.
 Texas State Network, a subsidiary of Entercom.
 Virginia News Network, a subsidiary of iHeartMedia.
 MetroNews Radio Network of West Virginia, a subsidiary of West Virginia Radio Corporation.
 Wisconsin Radio Network, a subsidiary of Learfield Communications.

Non-commercial broadcasters
 National Public Radio
 Native Voice 1
 Public Radio International
 Pacifica Network
 Radio Bilingüe (Spanish language)
 Northwest Community Radio Network
 American Public Media
 WRN Broadcast
 Public Radio Exchange
 Heartland Public Radio
 WFMT Radio Network

National government broadcasters

 American Forces Network (information/entertainment, for members of the U.S. military deployed abroad)
 NOAA Weather Radio All Hazards (information, for U.S. listeners)
 Radio Free Asia (For Asian listeners)
 Radio Free Europe/Radio Liberty (For Eastern European listeners)
 Radio Martí (For Cuban listeners)
 Radio Sawa (information/entertainment, for Middle East listeners)
 Voice of America (information/entertainment, for worldwide listeners)
 WWV Time Service (information, for U.S. and worldwide listeners)

Public radio state networks
 Alaska Public Radio Network
 Capital Public Radio Network
 CMU Public Radio (Michigan)
 Connecticut Public Radio
 ETV (South Carolina Public Radio Network)
 GPB Radio
 High Plains Public Radio
 Independent Public Radio (Minnesota)
 Indiana Public Radio
 Iowa Public Radio
 Jefferson Public Radio (southern Oregon/northern California)
 Kansas Public Radio
 Maine Public Broadcasting Network
 Minnesota Public Radio
 Montana Public Radio
 New Hampshire Public Radio
 New Jersey Public Radio
 North Carolina Public Radio
 Northeast Public Radio
 Ohio Public Radio
 Oregon Public Broadcasting
 Prairie Public (North Dakota)
 South Carolina Public Radio
 South Dakota Public Radio
 Utah Public Radio
 Vermont Public Radio
 Wisconsin Public Radio
 West Virginia Public Radio
 Wyoming Public Radio
 Yellowstone Public Radio

Religious broadcasters
 American Family Radio
 Bible Broadcasting Network
 Bott Radio Network
 Calvary Radio Network
 Christian FM Media Group
 CSN International (formerly Calvary Satellite Network)
 CDR Radio Network
 Edgewater Broadcasting Network
 EMF Broadcasting (Educational Media Foundation)
 Air 1
 K-LOVE
 EWTN Radio
 Family Life Communications
 Family Life Network
 Family Radio
 Flavor Radio Network
 Fundamental Broadcasting Network
 Immanuel Broadcasting Network
 Mars Hill Network
 Moody Radio
 Pilgrim Radio
 Pillar of Fire, Intl.
 Radio 74 Internationale
 Radio Maria
 Redeemer Broadcasting
 Rejoice! Musical Soul Food
 Relevant Radio
 Sheridan Gospel Network
 Smile FM (Michigan)
 Sound of Life Radio
 Three Angels Broadcasting Network (3ABN Radio Network)
 3ABN Latino Radio Network (Spanish-language Christian radio, owned by 3ABN)
 3ABN Radio Music Channel (Christian music radio, owned by 3ABN)
 USA Radio Network
 VCY America Radio Network

Former networks
 ABC News & Talk
 Accent Radio Network
 Air America Radio
 Amalgamated Broadcasting System
 Broadcast Programming Incorporated (now owned by Dial Global)
 CBN Northeast (an arm of the Christian Broadcasting Network)
 Dial Global (now named Westwood One)
 Drake-Chenault (now owned by Dial Global)
 Don Lee Network
 Enterprise Radio Network
 For the People Radio Network
 I.E. America Radio Network
 Independent Broadcasters Network
 Jones Radio Networks (now owned by Dial Global)
 Keystone Broadcasting System
 Liberty Broadcasting System (created by Gordon McClendon, father of Top-40 Radio; a subsidiary of the telecommunications company IDT Corp)
 MetroMedia Radio
 Mutual Black Network
 Mutual Broadcasting System (absorbed by Westwood One)
 Mutual Lifestyle Radio
 National Black Network
 National Radio Network
 NBC News and Information Service
 NBC Talknet
 NBC Radio Network
 NBG Radio Network
 Progressive Broadcasting System
 Radio Disney
 Radio Unica (Spanish-language radio network)
 Radiovisa (Spanish-language talk radio network)
 Richard Field Lewis Jr. Stations (later Mid Atlantic Network Inc.)
 RKO Radio Network (absorbed by Westwood One, see also Transtar)
 Rural Radio Network (operated 1948-1960 in New York state)
 Satellite Music Network (now owned by Cumulus Media Networks)
 Sheridan Broadcasting Network
 The Source
 Sports Fan Radio Network
 Talk America Radio Network (renamed Liberty Broadcasting System, a subsidiary of the telecommunications company IDT Corp)
 Transtar (still in operation under other names, now owned by Dial Global)
 United Press International Radio Network
 United Stations Radio Network (the original version, merged into Westwood One; the similarly named United Stations Radio Networks was a revival based on this version and is still in operation)
 Washington News Desk
 Waitt Radio Networks (now owned by Dial Global)
 Westinghouse Broadcasting Company (Group W)
 Yankee Network and Colonial Network

See also
 List of United States television networks